Cortinarius altissimus is a fungus native to Guyana. It was described in 2015 by Emma Harrower and colleagues, and is closely related to the northern hemisphere species Cortinarius violaceus.

See also
List of Cortinarius species

References

External links

altissimus
Fungi described in 2015
Fungi of Guyana